

147001–147100 

|-bgcolor=#f2f2f2
| colspan=4 align=center | 
|}

147101–147200 

|-bgcolor=#f2f2f2
| colspan=4 align=center | 
|}

147201–147300 

|-bgcolor=#f2f2f2
| colspan=4 align=center | 
|}

147301–147400 

|-id=397
| 147397 Bobhazel ||  || Robert Sealy (1927–2002) and Hazel Sealy (1930-2020), American founders of the Seaside Amateur Astronomers of Seaside, Oregon, and friends of the discoverer, James Whitney Young || 
|}

147401–147500 

|-id=421
| 147421 Gárdonyi || 2003 GG || Géza Gárdonyi (1863–1922), Hungarian writer and journalist || 
|}

147501–147600 

|-id=595
| 147595 Gojkomitić ||  || Gojko Mitić (born 1940), Serbian actor, director and stuntman. He starred as a Native American in several German Western movies and at the Karl May Festival in Bad Segeberg. || 
|}

147601–147700 

|-id=693
| 147693 Piccioni ||  || Giuseppe Piccioni (born 1965), Italian astronomer and expert on infrared imaging sensors || 
|}

147701–147800 

|-id=736
| 147736 Raxavinic ||  || Airline pilot trainee Rapha, experimental physicist Xavier and software engineer Vince, are the sons of the discoverer and his wife Nicole "Nicnac" Bosmans, a secretary at Brussels University || 
|-id=766
| 147766 Elisatoffoli ||  || Elisa Toffoli (born 1977), an Italian singer-songwriter. || 
|}

147801–147900 

|-bgcolor=#f2f2f2
| colspan=4 align=center | 
|}

147901–148000 

|-id=918
| 147918 Chiayi ||  || Chiayi County in southwestern Taiwan, location of the Lulin Observatory where this minor planet was discovered || 
|-id=971
| 147971 Nametoko || 1994 WF || Nametoko Ravine is a narrow canyon in the Ashizuri-Uwakai National Park, Japan, located in the south of Ehime Prefecture || 
|}

References 

147001-148000